Farmers Institute is a historic school building on a small campus in Shadeland, Tippecanoe County, Indiana.  It was built in 1851, and expanded to its present two stories in 1864–1865.  It is a two-story, rectangular, frame building with modest Greek Revival style design elements.  It housed a school from its construction until 1874, and again from 1882 to 1889, during which it also housed a public library.  Since then, it has exclusively housed the Farmers Institute Friends Church, a Quaker meetinghouse.

It was listed on the National Register of Historic Places in 1986, with a boundary enlargement in 2020.

References

Quaker schools in the United States
Quaker meeting houses in Indiana
School buildings on the National Register of Historic Places in Indiana
Greek Revival architecture in Indiana
School buildings completed in 1851
Schools in Tippecanoe County, Indiana
National Register of Historic Places in Tippecanoe County, Indiana